John Hawley Edwards (21 March 1850 – 14 January 1893) was an English footballer who made one appearance for England in 1874, before going on to play for Wales in 1876. He was a member of the Wanderers team that won the 1876 FA Cup Final.

Career
Edwards was born in Shrewsbury, educated at Shifnal Grammar School, and was a qualified solicitor, being admitted in 1871. He played from 1873 to 1880 for Shropshire Wanderers, of which he was a founder and captain, when they reached the semi-final tie of the FA Cup in 1874–75 and were defeated by the Old Etonians.

He was called into the England side as a late replacement for another Shrewsbury-born player, John Wylie. He made his solitary England appearance on 7 March 1874 against Scotland, playing as an inside forward. After "a most competitive game", Scotland won 2–1, with Robert Kingsford scoring England's consolation goal.

He was also a member of the Wanderers team, making his first appearance on 4 March 1874, scoring in a 4–0 victory over Westminster School. In 1876, he only made two appearances for Wanderers, both in the Cup Final when he played at centre forward against the Old Etonians. In the first match, played at Kennington Oval on 11 March 1876, Edwards scored the first goal, turning in a cross from Charles Wollaston. The Old Etonians equalised through Alexander Bonsor, so the match went to a replay, which the Wanderers won 3–0, thus winning the trophy for the third time in five years.

Edwards had been instrumental in helping to establish the Welsh Football Association, serving as its first treasurer in 1876. A week after the FA Cup Final replay, Edwards played for the Wales national team in their inaugural match, played at Hamilton Crescent, Partick on 25 March 1876. The match ended in a 4–0 victory for the Scots. Edwards was one of two players to play at full international level for both England and Wales, the other being Robert Evans, who made ten appearances for Wales and then played four times for England. He also played in representative matches for North Wales and Staffordshire.

He captained the Shrewsbury Town team (not the present Shrewsbury Town F.C., formed 1886) from 1876 to 1880, during which time they won both the Birmingham Senior Cup and Shropshire County Cup in the 1877–78 season, two years before he ceased to play after a series of knee injuries.

Edwards was for a time also on the committee of the Birmingham and District Football Association and a founder of the county F.A. for Shropshire in 1877.

Edwards was also a useful cricketer and played for Shropshire for several years and served the club as secretary, as well as for Warwickshire county (not first-class) and Shrewsbury Cricket Club.

He was later clerk to Shrewsbury Magistrates' Court for nineteen years until his death on 14 January 1893, while convalescing from throat infection at Old Colwyn in Wales He was buried in the General Cemetery at Longden Road, Shrewsbury.

Honours
Wanderers
FA Cup: 1876

See also
 List of association footballers who have been capped for two senior national teams 
 List of Wales international footballers born outside Wales

References

External links

England profile

1850 births
1893 deaths
Sportspeople from Shrewsbury
English footballers
Welsh footballers
Wanderers F.C. players
England international footballers
Wales international footballers
Dual internationalists (football)
Welsh football chairmen and investors
English solicitors
Shropshire Wanderers F.C. players
Association football forwards
FA Cup Final players
19th-century English lawyers
19th-century Welsh businesspeople